is a Japanese manga series written by Marita Morita and illustrated by Takayoshi Kuroda. It was serialized in Shogakukan's shōnen manga magazine Weekly Shōnen Sunday from April 2012 to September 2013, with its chapters collected in seven tankōbon volumes.

Publication
Written by Marita Morita and illustrated by Takayoshi Kuroda, Tadashii Kodomo no Tsukurikata! was serialized in Shogakukan's shōnen manga magazine Weekly Shōnen Sunday from April 25, 2012, to September 18, 2013. Shogakukan collected its chapters in seven tankōbon volumes, released from November 16, 2012, to November 18, 2013.

Volume list

References

External links
 

Romantic comedy anime and manga
Science fiction anime and manga
Shogakukan manga
Shōnen manga